Bihari Ahirs or Ahirs of Bihar refers to the people of Ahir community of the Indian state of Bihar. They are different from the Yadav caste however some people have attempted to portray them as same castes. They are also known as Yadav, Gope, Rai etc. The Yadavs form nearly 11% of the state's population and are included in the Other Backward Class category.

History
Bihari Ahirs, just like other Ahir claim descendence from lord Krishna of ancient Yadu tribe. 

At one time the main occupation of the Ahirs of Bihar was rearing cattle, but now most of them are cultivator. While majority of Ahirs were peasants with minor landholdings in the Northern and Central parts of India, a few Ahirs had taken over large tract of land in the newly reclaimed portion of Eastern Bihar (Purnea and Saharsa) and had become big landholders.

List of chieftain and zamindari
In Bihar, there were many zamindars belonging to Ahir caste. These zamindars belonged to the difficult geographical regions, mostly diara land of the rivers. In the diara regions their rule continued with the help of their militia.

The Ahir zamindars were predominantly found in northern and eastern parts of Bihar.

Rati Raut, an Ahir chief of Rati Paragana in north Bihar.
Daso Ahir, Raja of Bhojpur.
Ahir chief of Ruidas-Patna.
Ahir Rajas of Gawror Fort, Patna.
Ahir Chieftain of Murho Estate (Madhepura).
Kishnaut Ahir zamindars of Parasadi Estate and Parsauna (Saran).
Babu Girwar Narayan Mandal, Zamindar of Ranipatti (Madhepura).
Zamindars of Pipra estate in erstwhile Munger district (Now in Shambhuganj block of Banka district, Bihar).

Subdivision
There are four main sub-castes of Ahirs in Bihar, Kishnaut, Majhraut, Kannaujia or Kanyakubja and Goria. Apart from these four, Ahir sub-caste like Ghoshi, Dhadhor, Gwal and Sadgop are also found in small numbers. Among them the first three never sell either milk, ghee or butter, and have, to a large extent, became cultivator.

Title
The titles generally used by Ahirs in Bihar are Yadav, Rai, Roy, Chaudhary, Gope, Mandal, Singh, Raut etc.

Culture

Caste deities 
In Kosi division of Bihar, people of the Ahir  caste worship their caste deity Bisu Raut, whose temple is situated on the banks of the Gogri river.

Gobanai Baba is worshipped by Ahir families of Darbhanga district. His temple is situated in village Mahulia.

Politics
Around 1933–1934, the Yadavs joined with the Kurmis and Koeris to form the Triveni Sangh, a caste federation that by 1936 claimed to have a million supporters. This coalition followed an alliance for the 1930 local elections which fared badly at the polls. The new grouping had little electoral success: it won a few seats in the 1937 elections but was stymied by a two-pronged opposition which saw the rival Congress wooing some of its more wealthy leading lights to a newly formed unit called the "Backward Class Federation" and an effective opposition from upper castes organised to keep the lower castes in their customary place. Added to this, the three putatively allied castes were unable to set aside their communal rivalries and the Triveni Sangh also faced competition from the All India Kisan Sabha, a peasant-oriented socio-political campaigning group run by the Communists. The appeal of the Triveni Sangh had waned significantly by 1947 but had achieved a measure of success away from the ballot box, notably by exerting sufficient influence to bring an end to the begar system of forced unpaid labour and by providing a platform for those voices seeking reservation of jobs in government for people who were not upper castes. Many years later, in 1965, there was an abortive attempt to revive the defunct federation.

In the post Mandal phase Kurmi, Koeri and Yadav, the three backward castes who constitute the upper-OBC due to their advantageous position in the socio-economic sphere of agrarian society became the new political elite of the state.

Notable politicians
B.P. Mandal, ex-cm of Bihar.
Daroga Prasad Rai, ex-cm of Bihar.
Ram Lakhan Singh Yadav, former M.P
Ram Jaipal Singh Yadav, ex-deputy cm of Bihar.
Lalu Prasad Yadav, ex-cm of Bihar
Rabri Devi, ex-cm of Bihar.
Tejashwi Yadav, deputy cm of Bihar.
Nityanand Rai, M.P of BJP

Present circumstances
It is shown in the Bengal Census Report that 80 per cent of the Ahirs in Bihar are engaged in agriculture.

According to a report of Institute Of Human Development Studies, among the upper-backwards, castes like  Kushwahas and Kurmis earn Rs 18,811 and Rs 17,835 respectively as their average per capita income, which is slight lesser than those earned by upper-caste, who earn 20,655 as their average per capita income. In contrast, Yadavs’ income is one of the lowest among OBCs at Rs 12,314, which is slightly less than the rest of OBCs (Rs 12,617). According to this report, the economic benefits of the Mandal politics could be seen as affecting only few backward castes of agrarian background leading to their upward mobilisation. Yadavs, who are considered as politically most dominant caste in Bihar have failed to translate their upward mobilisation in other fields.

See also
Ahir
Ahir clans

References

Yadav
Bihari Ahirs
Social groups of Bihar